The matrix method is a structural analysis method used as a fundamental principle in many applications in civil engineering. 

The method is carried out, using either a stiffness matrix or a flexibility matrix.

See also
 Direct stiffness method
 Flexibility method

Structural analysis